Michael Steven Kennedy (born 1969) is an American physician, attorney, and politician. He has served as a Republican member of the Utah Senate, representing District 21 since 2023. Prior to redistricting he represented District 14 starting in 2021. He previously served as a member of the Utah House of Representatives from 2013 to 2019.

Kennedy was a candidate in the 2018 U.S. Senate election in Utah. He received the most votes among delegates at the Utah State Republican Convention (finishing 57 votes ahead of Mitt Romney) but was defeated by Romney in the subsequent primary by more than 40 percentage points for the Republican nomination.

Early life and career
Kennedy earned his BS from Brigham Young University. While a student at BYU Kennedy took two years off to serve as a missionary for the Church of Jesus Christ of Latter-day Saints.

He earned his MD from Michigan State University, and his JD from Brigham Young University's J. Reuben Clark Law School. Kennedy lives in Alpine, Utah, where he works as a family doctor for Premier Family Medical Group.

Political career
When District 27 incumbent Republican Representative John Dougall ran for state auditor and left the seat open, Kennedy was selected as one of two candidates from five by the Republican convention for the June 26, 2012 Republican primary which he won with 2,586 votes (52.9%) and won the November 6, 2012 general election with 14,335 votes (92.1%) against Constitution candidate Scott Morgan.

During the 2014 general election, Kennedy faced Democratic nominee William McGree, winning with 6,997 votes (88.4%).

During the 2016 legislative session, Kennedy served on the Public Education Appropriations Subcommittee, the House Health and Human Services Committee, and the House Political Subdivisions Committee.

On March 9, 2018, Kennedy distributed a letter to members of District 27 announcing that he would not seek re-election for the Utah House of Representatives. He instead opted to run for the U.S. Senate. On April 22, 2018, Kennedy edged out Mitt Romney at the Republican Convention with 50.88% of the delegate votes. Romney came in a close second with 49.12%, allowing both to compete in the primary on June 26, 2018.

Kennedy decisively lost the primary, however, garnering less than 30 percent of the vote. As a physician, Dr. Kennedy has worked with health care issues and opposes Obamacare.  He has supported President Trump's immigration policies and admires Antonin Scalia as a jurist.  
Kennedy drew attention as a vocal supporter of gun rights, even meeting with UtahGunExchange.com, a private gun exchange that had a presence at March For Our Lives near the Utah Capitol and the 2018 Chicago Peace March and Rally, where their militaristic vehicle included a replica .50-caliber machine gun.

2016 sponsored legislation

Kennedy passed two of the four bills he introduced, giving him a 50% passage rate. He also floor sponsored three bills. He has a 92.7% lifetime rating from the Utah Taxpayers Association.  Kennedy stresses that he has an "A rating" on gun legislation from the National Rifle Association.

References

External links
 Official page at the Utah State Legislature
 Campaign site
 Mike Kennedy at Ballotpedia
 Mike Kennedy at the National Institute on Money in State Politics

Place of birth missing (living people)
1969 births
Living people
Brigham Young University alumni
J. Reuben Clark Law School alumni
Republican Party members of the Utah House of Representatives
Michigan State University alumni
People from Alpine, Utah
Utah lawyers
Latter Day Saints from Michigan
American physicians
Latter Day Saints from Utah
Candidates in the 2018 United States Senate elections